"I love to steal awhile away" (originally, "An Apology for my Twilight Rambles, Addressed to a Lady") is a Christian hymn written by Phoebe Hinsdale Brown in 1818 in New Haven, Connecticut, U.S. It was Brown's habit to retire some distance from her house every day at a certain hour for meditation and prayer. The well-beaten path to the woods was discovered, and she was ridiculed by a thoughtless neighbor. "I love to steal awhile away" was written that night in tears, and later sung wherever the English language is spoken. The original version of the poem referenced Brown's domestic cares, but these were removed by the Rev. Asahel Nettleton in the published hymn.

Origin

Brown's own account of the origin of the hymn, which had nine stanzas when first written, is as follows:—

Publication

The family removed, in 1818, to Monson, Massachusetts, just over the State line, where her brother-in-law, Alfred Ely, D.D., was settled in the ministry. When Dr. Nettleton was compiling his volume of "Village Hymns," he applied, at the suggestion of Dr. Ely, to Brown, then residing at Monson, for some of her productions. The Rev. Dr. Charles Hyde of Ellington, who was a neighbor of Brown, procured a copy of the original hymn. He was assisting Nettleton to compile the Village Hymns.

Brown provided this revised hymn and three others to Nettleton, and they were inserted in his collection. The tune, "Monson," was composed for it by her son, the Rev. Samuel Robbins Brown, D.D., as was also the tune, "Brown," named for her by W. B. Bradbury. The hymn beginning with "O Lord! thy work revive", "was written from the impulse of a full heart, and shown to a friend, who begged a copy for private use. It soon found its way to the public in the 'Spiritual Songs'. Written at Monson, 1819." Such was Brown's own account of it.

In 1853, it was included in the Leeds H. Bk., and thus became known to English collections. It was also found in Lyra Sac. Amer., p. 39.

Tune
Brown's son Samuel, who, besides being a good minister, inherited his grandfather's musical gift, composed the tune of "Monson," (named in his mother's honor, after her late home), and it may have been the first music set to her hymn. It was the fate of his offering, however, to lose its filial place, and be succeeded by different melodies, though his own still survives in a few collections, sometimes with Collyer's "O Jesus in this solemn hour." It is good music for a hymn of praise rather than for meditative verse. For many years, the hymn was sung to "Woodstock," a tune by Deodatus Dutton. Dutton's "Woodstock" and Bradbury's "Brown," which often replaces it, are worthy rivals of each other, and both continue in favor as fit choral interpretations of the much-loved hymn.

References

Attribution

Bibliography
 

American Christian hymns
1818 songs
1818 in Christianity
Ellington, Connecticut
Literature by women
19th-century hymns